Andrew Karam (born 1981/1982) is an American businessman and billionaire who cofounded mobile game developer AppLovin.

Biography
Karam is a graduate of Tufts University where he received a B.A. in economics and a B.S. in engineering. After school, he cofounded Social Hour and Style Page, a social platform for designers. In 2012, he cofounded the mobile game developer AppLovin with Adam Foroughi and John Krystynak. AppLovin went public in April 2021. As of 2022, Karam owns 8% of AppLovin stock.

Personal life
He lives in Menlo Park, California.

Net worth
Forbes lists his net worth as of April 2022 at US$1.1 billion.

References 

American billionaires
American company founders
21st-century American businesspeople
Living people
1980s births
Tufts University School of Arts and Sciences alumni
Tufts University School of Engineering alumni